Caturix (Gaulish for "battle king") was the war god of the Helvetii.

Names
Caturix became known as Mars Caturix in Gallo-Roman religion by interpretation as Mars. There was a temple dedicated to Mars Caturix  in Aventicum, the capital of Roman Helvetia, another one in Nonfoux, Essertines-sur-Yverdon. 

Other names (epitheta) of Caturix may have been Cicollus and Caisivus. Caturix has itself been interpreted as originating as an epithet of Toutatis.

Etymology
The Gaulish name catu-rix means 'battle-king' or 'battle-lord', stemming from Gaulish root catu- ('combat, battle') attached to rix ('king'). The root catu- is cognate to similar words in Celtic languages, including Old Irish cath ('battle, troop') and Old Welsh cad ('battle'), and is attested in other Celtic personal names such as Catigern.

The Gallic tribe of the Caturiges ('battle-kings'), settling in the area of modern Chorges (from Latin: Caturigumagus) was apparently named after the god. The capital of the Caturiges was called Eburodunum (modern Embrun), i.e. the same name as that of Yverdon, suggesting a close relationship between the Caturiges and the Helvetii.

Inscriptions
Five dedicatory inscriptions to Caturix were found in the area settled by the Helvetii, all of them close to Avenches (Aventicum) and Yverdon (Eburodunum). A sixth inscription has been found in isolation in  Böckingen, Heilbronn, Germany.

Riaz : HM 181 :    ...]ATVRIG[...
Nonfoux : HM 164 : MARTI CATVRIGI ... TEMPLVM A NOVO IN[ST]ITVIT
Pomy:  HM 165: : MARTI CATVR SACR ...
Yverdon: HM 172  : MARTI CATVRICI ET APOLLINI ...
Avenches: HM 222:  MARTI CATVR ...
Avenches:  HM221 :  MART CAISIV ...
Böckingen: : IOM ET MARTI CATVRIGI GENIO LOCI ...

References

Bibliography
 Gerold Walser: Römische Inschriftkunst, Franz Steiner Verlag, 1993, S. 70,  
 Bernhard Maier: Lexikon der keltischen Religion und Kultur; Kröner, Stuttgart (1994). 
 Ernst Howald, Ernst Meier: Die römische Schweiz; Zürich (1940).
 

Gaulish gods
War gods
Helvetii